The Monsters and the Critics, and Other Essays is a collection of J. R. R. Tolkien's scholarly linguistic essays edited by his son Christopher and published posthumously in 1983.

All of them were initially delivered as lectures to academics, with the exception of "On Translating Beowulf", which Christopher Tolkien notes in his foreword is not addressed to an academic audience.

Essays
The essays are:
 "Beowulf: the Monsters and the Critics" looks at the critics' understanding of Beowulf, and proposes instead a fresh take on the poem.
 "On Translating Beowulf" looks at the difficulties in translating the poem from Old English. 
 "On Fairy-Stories," the 1939 Andrew Lang lecture at St Andrew's University, is a defence of the fantasy genre. 
"A Secret Vice" talks about creating imaginary languages, giving background to Tolkien's Quenya and Sindarin. 
"Sir Gawain and the Green Knight" is a study of the medieval poem of the same name.
"English and Welsh," the inaugural O'Donnell Memorial Lecture (1955), is a survey of the historical relationship between the two tongues, including an analysis of the word Welsh. 
"Valedictory Address to the University of Oxford", given upon his retirement in 1959.

Versions

 The Monsters and the Critics, and Other Essays (1983). J.R.R. Tolkien and Christopher Tolkien. George Allen and Unwin. 
--- (1984) Houghton Mifflin. 
--- (1997) HarperCollins. 

Essays in literary criticism
Collections of works by J. R. R. Tolkien
Essays by J. R. R. Tolkien
1983 books
Houghton Mifflin books
Allen & Unwin books